The Rewa River is the longest and widest river in Fiji. Located on the island  of Viti Levu, the Rewa originates in Tomanivi, the highest peak in Fiji, and flows southeast for 145 km to Laucala Bay, near Suva. The Rewa River drains approximately one-third of Viti Levu.

The Rewa River is fed by two large tributaries, the Wainibuka and the Wainimala  and it is joined by several other rivers of importance before it reaches the sea by a delta of many mouths. It is navigable by small crafts up 80 kilometers from its mouth and its basin is enriched by a deep deposit of alluvial soil. The delta of the river is where several Fijian villages are situated.  The Rewa River is crossed by the Rewa Bridge at Nausori.

References

Rivers of Viti Levu